Marsha Ambrosius-Billups (born 8 August 1977) is an English singer and songwriter from Liverpool, England. She embarked on her musical career as a member of Floetry. Ambrosius released her debut solo album Late Nights & Early Mornings in March 2011. She also has a brother, Marvin Ambrosius, a television presenter in the United Kingdom.

Musical career

Early career with Floetry
Original Floetry members Marsha Ambrosius and Natalie Stewart met through their love of basketball. Both Stewart and Ambrosius attended the BRIT School for Performing Arts and Technology where Ambrosius studied Business and Finance and Stewart Performing Arts, Media and Art. For college Ambrosius planned to attend the Georgia Institute of Technology in Atlanta, Georgia, but could not due to an injury. Stewart attended Middlesex University in London and later transferred to North London University. During these years, the women kept in touch. Stewart was a founding member of the performance poetry group 3 Plus 1 which was rising to Han Solo in London, Birmingham and Manchester. In 1999, Ambrosius wrote and submitted a song to her publishers Perfect Songs called "Fantasize", inviting Stewart to lend some of her poetry to the song. This collaboration led to the creation of Floetry.

Group success

In 2000, the duo travelled to the United States to perform on the poetry circuit. After frequenting spoken word/poetry spots in Atlanta such as Yin Yang Poets' Cafe (to positive reviews), they moved on to Philadelphia. There they met Darren "Limitless" Henson and Keith "Keshon" Pelzer of DJ Jazzy Jeff's Touch Of Jazz studio and began recording. She also worked with Michael Jackson - she composed and sang as back-vocal the song "Butterflies" from the album "Invincible" released in 2001 and in 2002 a single version of this song was published. In the same year, they signed with DreamWorks Records and released their debut album Floetic, which featured the singles "Floetic" "Say Yes" and "Getting Late". The album was also released in the UK with additional tracks, one of which features British singer/songwriter and producer Sebastian Rogers. They released two more albums: 2003's live effort Floacism and 2005's studio album Flo'Ology.

Solo career
Ambrosius has been featured on many songs including Styles P's "I'm Black"; The Game's "Start from Scratch" and "Why You Hate The Game." (also featuring Nas); Busta Rhymes' "Get You Some" and "Cocaina"; Nas' "Hustlers" (also featuring The Game); and Hi-Tek's "Music for Life" and Jamie Foxx's "Freak'in Me". The group has also collaborated with Earth, Wind & Fire on their album, Illumination, on the track "Elevated". She provided background vocals to the Justin Timberlake single “Cry Me a River”, notably singing the ad lib “Cry me, cry meeee” at the end of the song. She collaborated once again with Slum Village on a song called "Cloud 9". In 2009, she guested on Wale's "Diary".

Aftermath Entertainment
Ambrosius was approached to sign to Dr. Dre's record label, Aftermath Entertainment, as a solo musician/songwriter/producer. In 2007, she released a mixtape entitled, Neo Soul is Dead. Parting ways with the offer in early 2009, Ambrosius pursued her song-writing/production career landing her placements with R&B and hip hop artists ranging from Alicia Keys, Raven-Symoné, Jamie Foxx and Mario to Fabolous, Slum Village and Wale.

Late Nights & Early Mornings

In summer 2009, Ambrosius was approached by numerous record labels offering her a solo deal after a long-awaited performance at NYC's SOB's where a sold out crowd gathered to a show accompanied by The Roots and DJ Aktive. In December 2009, Ambrosius signed to J Records and her solo debut Late Nights & Early Mornings was released on 1 March 2011. "Hope She Cheats On You (With A Basketball Player)" produced by Canei Finch was released as the album's first single on 13 August 2010. The song charted on the US Billboard Hot R&B/Hip-Hop Songs chart and peaked at No. 22. "Far Away" was released as the album's second single on 7 December 2010.  The album would debut at No. 1 on the US Billboard R&B Albums chart and No. 2 on the US Billboard 200 behind Adele and ahead of Mumford & Sons, marking the first time in over 20 years that British acts had topped the US charts.

Ambrosius won the Centric Award at the BET Awards of 2011. She was also nominated for Best Female R&B Artist  at the BET Awards 2012.

Ambrosius won the Record of The Year (Ashford & Simpson Songwriters Award) at the 2011 Soul Train Awards for the song "Far Away."

In December 2011, she received two Grammy nominations (Best R&B Song / Best R&B Performance for "Far Away"), the night before she performed at the White House with the President and First Family at the National Christmas Tree lighting.

Friends & Lovers
In August 2011, RCA Music Group announced it was disbanding J Records along with Arista Records and Jive Records.  With the shutdown, Ambrosius (and all other artists previously signed to these three labels) will release her future material on the RCA Records brand.

Ambrosius released her second studio album, titled Friends & Lovers, in July 2014. Ambrosius received two MOBO Award nominations for the album. In 2015 Ambrosius received a nomination for Grammy Award for Best Traditional R&B Performance for "As," a collaboration she recorded with Anthony Hamilton for The Best Man Holiday.

Nyla
In March 2017, she premiered a new song "Don't Wake the Baby" produced by Dem Jointz and called it "a song for Beyoncé." Additionally, she announced a summer tour with Eric Benet titled The M.E. Tour.

In May, she released her first single "Luh Ya" off her upcoming untitled album, marking her move to an independent label.

In June 2018, she released the album's second single "Old Times" and premiered the music video. In September, she announced her third studio album would be titled Nyla and will be released on September 28. The album's third single, "Flood" was also released.

Personal life
In November 2016, Ambrosius announced she was engaged to Dez Billups. In an interview in 2018, she revealed that she and Dez were married in 2017. They welcomed their first child Nyla in December 2016. Ambrosius is a fan of Liverpool F.C.

Ambrosius is an honorary member of Sigma Gamma Rho Sorority, Inc.

Discography

Studio albums

Singles
For discography of singles as a part of duo Floetry, see Floetry Discography

Guest appearances

Writing credits 
 2001: "Butterflies" - Michael Jackson (Invincible)
 2002: "Simple Things", "Beautiful Eyes", "Lonely", "This Love", "Take You High" - Glenn Lewis (World Outside My Window)
 2004: "My Man" - Angie Stone (Stone Love)
 2006: "Circus" - Kelis (Kelis Was Here)
 2007: "Go Ahead" - Alicia Keys (As I Am)
 2008: "Wanna Go Back" - Solange featuring Marsha Ambrosius and Q-Tip (SoL-AngeL and the Hadley St. Dreams)
 2008: "Love Me Or Leave Me" - Raven-Symoné (Raven-Symoné)
 2008: "Do About It", "Mirror"  - Girlicious (Girlicious)
 2008: "Music (All I Need)" - Jazmine Sullivan
 2009: "Matter" - Letoya (Lady Love)
 2009: "25 To Life" - JoJo
 2015: "Picture Perfect", "When We Make Love" - Tyrese (Black Rose)
 2018 "Knock You Out", Mya Harrison, Mya -
 2018 "My Song, H.E.R.

References

External links

1977 births
Living people
Singers from Liverpool
Neo soul singers
21st-century Black British women singers
British contemporary R&B singers
English soul singers
English women singer-songwriters
People educated at the BRIT School
RCA Records artists
British hip hop singers
British women hip hop musicians